The 2021–22 Women's Volleyball Thailand League is the 17th season of the Women's Volleyball Thailand League, the top Thai professional league for women's volleyball clubs, since its establishment in 2005, also known as Daikin Women's Volleyball Thailand League due to the sponsorship deal with Daikin. A total of 8 teams will compete in the league. The season will begin on 12 November 2020  and is scheduled to conclude in 2021. This season will be organized by the Thailand Volleyball Association (TVA) instead Thailand Volleyball Co.,Ltd. The season started.

Teams
Eight teams compete in the league – the top six teams from the previous season and the two teams promoted from the Pro Challenge. The promoted teams are Black power Udonthani and Kasetsart university. Black power Udonthani VC reaches a top division for the first time and Kasetsart university at 2nd  top division for the first time. Black power Udonthani replaced RSU VC (relegated after four years in the top division) and  Kasetsart university replaced Samut Prakan VC (relegated after four years in the top division).

Qualified teams
League positions of the previous season shown in parentheses (TH: Thailand League title holders; SL: Super League title holders).
<div style="width:850px;">

</div style="width:850px;">

Personnel and kits

Squads

National team players
Players name in bold indicates the player is registered during the mid-season transfer window.

Foreign players
Players name in bold indicates the player is registered during the mid-season transfer window.

 Withdraws

Transfers

Second leg

Format
Regular seasons
First leg (Week 1–6): single round-robin; The  seventh place and eighth place will relegate to Pro League.
Second leg: (Week 7–13) single round-robin; The top four will advance to Final series.
Final series
First leg (Week 14): single round-robin.
Second leg: (Week 15) single round-robin.

Standing procedure 
 Number of matches won
 Match points
 Sets ratio
 Points ratio
 Result of the last match between the tied teams

Match won 3–0 or 3–1: 3 match points for the winner, 0 match points for the loser
Match won 3–2: 2 match points for the winner, 1 match point for the loser

Regular seasons – First leg

First leg table

Positions by round

Week 1
Venue: MCC Hall The Mall Ngamwongwan, Nonthaburi
Dates: 08–09 December 2021
 

 

 

|}

Week 2
Venue: MCC Hall The Mall Ngamwongwan, Nonthaburi
Dates: 22–23 December 2021
 

 

 

 

|}

Week 3
Venue: MCC Hall The Mall Ngamwongwan, Nonthaburi
Dates: 28–29 December 2021
 

 

 

 

|}

Week 4
Venue: Nimibutr Stadium, Bangkok
Dates: 08–09 January 2022
 

 

 

 

|}

Week 5
Venue: Nimibutr Stadium, Bangkok
Dates: 12–13 January 2022
 

 

 

 

|}

Week 6
Venue: Nimibutr Stadium, Bangkok
Dates: 15–16 January 2022
 

 

 

 

|}

Week 7
Venue: Nimibutr Stadium, Bangkok
Dates: 22–23 January 2022
 

 

 

 

|}

Regular seasons – Second leg

Second leg table

Positions by round

Week 8
Venue: Nimibutr Stadium, Bangkok
Dates: 29–30 January 2022

|}

Week 9
Venue: Nimibutr Stadium, Bangkok
Dates: 02 February 2022

|}

Week 10
Venue: Nimibutr Stadium, Bangkok
Dates: 05–09 February 2022

|}

Week 11
Venue: Nimibutr Stadium, Bangkok
Dates: 12–13 February 2022

|}

Week 12
Venue: Nimibutr Stadium, Bangkok
Dates: 19–20 February 2022

|}

Final series

Final series table

Week 13
Venue: MCC Hall The Mall Bangkapi, Bangkok 
Dates: 25–27 February 2022

|}

References

 
 
 

Women's volleyball in Thailand